Carol Elspeth Goodeve Brayne CBE is a British academic and the Professor of Public Health Medicine at the University of Cambridge and Chair of Wellcome's Population and Public Health Review Group. She is Director of the Cambridge Institute of Public Health. She is a special advisor for the Royal College of Physicians and a senior investigator at the National Institute for Health Research (NIHR).

Brayne has a degree in medicine from the Royal Free Hospital School of Medicine, University of London.

In the 2017 Birthday Honours, Brayne was made a CBE, "For services to Public Health Medicine".

Selected publications
Age-Associated White Matter Lesions: The MRC Cognitive Function and Ageing Study. Wharton SB, Simpson JE, Brayne C, Ince PG. Brain Pathol. 2015 Jan;25(1):35–43.
Potential for primary prevention of Alzheimer's disease: an analysis of population-based data. Norton S, Matthews FE, Barnes DE, Yaffe K, Brayne C. Lancet Neurol. 2014 Aug;13(8):788-94.
Adapting to dementia in society: a challenge for our lifetimes and a charge for public health. D'Alton S, Hunter S, Whitehouse P, Brayne C, George D. J Alzheimers Dis. 2014;42(4):1151–63.
Dementia prediction for people with stroke in populations: is mild cognitive impairment a useful concept? Stephan BC, Minett T, Muniz Terrera G, Matthews FE, Brayne C. Age Ageing. 2015 Jan;44(1):78–83.
Reporting standards for studies of diagnostic test accuracy in dementia: The STARDdem Initiative. Noel-Storr AH, McCleery JM, Richard E, Ritchie CW, Flicker L, Cullum SJ, Davis D, Quinn TJ, Hyde C, Rutjes AW, Smailagic N, Marcus S, Black S, Blennow K, Brayne C, Fiorivanti M, Johnson JK, Köpke S, Schneider LS, Simmons A, Mattsson N, Zetterberg H, Bossuyt PM, Wilcock G, McShane R. Neurology. 2014 Jul 22;83(4):364-73.
Gene-wide analysis detects two new susceptibility genes for Alzheimer's disease. Escott-Price V, Bellenguez C, Wang LS, ... Brayne C, ... Amouyel P, Williams J; Cardiovascular Health Study (CHS). PLoS One. 2014 Jun 12;9(6):e94661.
DNA damage response and senescence in endothelial cells of human cerebral cortex and relation to Alzheimer's neuropathology progression: a population-based study in the Medical Research Council Cognitive Function and Ageing Study (MRC-CFAS) cohort. Garwood CJ, Simpson JE, Al Mashhadi S, Axe C, Wilson S, Heath PR, Shaw PJ, Matthews FE, Brayne C, Ince PG, Wharton SB; MRC Cognitive Function and Ageing Study. Neuropathol Appl Neurobiol. 2014 Dec;40(7):802-14.
Brain haemosiderin in older people: pathological evidence for an ischaemic origin of magnetic resonance imaging (MRI) microbleeds. Janaway BM, Simpson JE, Hoggard N, Highley JR, Forster G, Drew D, Gebril OH, Matthews FE, Brayne C, Wharton SB, Ince PG; MRC Cognitive Function and Ageing Neuropathology Study. Neuropathol Appl Neurobiol. 2014 Apr;40(3):258-69.
Health economic evaluation of treatments for Alzheimer's disease: impact of new diagnostic criteria. Wimo A, Ballard C, Brayne C, Gauthier S, Handels R, Jones RW, Jonsson L, Khachaturian AS, Kramberger M. J Intern Med. 2014 Mar;275(3):304-16.
Health-related quality of life in the Cambridge City over-75s Cohort (CC75C): development of a dementia-specific scale and descriptive analyses. Perales J, Cosco TD, Stephan BC, Fleming J, Martin S, Haro JM, Brayne C; CC75C Study. BMC Geriatr. 2014 Feb 10;14:18.
C-reactive protein, APOE genotype and longitudinal cognitive change in an older population. Lima TA, Adler AL, Minett T, Matthews FE, Brayne C, Marioni RE; Medical Research Council Cognitive Function and Ageing Study. Age Ageing. 2014 Mar;43(2):289-92.
Cardiovascular disease contributes to Alzheimer's disease: evidence from large-scale genome-wide association studies. Liu G, Yao L, Liu J, Jiang Y, Ma G; Genetic and Environmental Risk for Alzheimer's disease (GERAD1) Consortium, Chen Z, Zhao B, Li K. Neurobiol Aging. 2014 Apr;35(4):786-92.
COSMIC (Cohort Studies of Memory in an International Consortium): an international consortium to identify risk and protective factors and biomarkers of cognitive ageing and dementia in diverse ethnic and sociocultural groups. Sachdev PS, Lipnicki DM, Kochan NA, Crawford JD, Rockwood K, Xiao S, Li J, Li X, Brayne C, Matthews FE, Stephan BC, Lipton RB, Katz MJ, Ritchie K, Carrière I, Ancelin ML, Seshadri S, Au R, Beiser AS, Lam LC, Wong CH, Fung AW, Kim KW, Han JW, Kim TH, Petersen RC, Roberts RO, Mielke MM, Ganguli M, Dodge HH, Hughes T, Anstey KJ, Cherbuin N, Butterworth P, Ng TP, Gao Q, Reppermund S, Brodaty H, Meguro K, Schupf N, Manly J, Stern Y, Lobo A, Lopez-Anton R, Santabárbara J; COSMIC. BMC Neurol. 2013 Nov 6;13:165.
Meta-analysis of 74,046 individuals identifies 11 new susceptibility loci for Alzheimer's disease. Lambert JC, Ibrahim-Verbaas CA, Harold D, ... Brayne C, ... Williams J, Schellenberg GD, Amouyel P. Nat Genet. 2013 Dec;45(12):1452-8.
Neuroimaging standards for research into small vessel disease and its contribution to ageing and neurodegeneration. Wardlaw JM, Smith EE, Biessels GJ, Cordonnier C, Fazekas F, Frayne R, Lindley RI, O'Brien JT, Barkhof F, Benavente OR, Black SE, Brayne C, Breteler M, Chabriat H, Decarli C, de Leeuw FE, Doubal F, Duering M, Fox NC, Greenberg S, Hachinski V, Kilimann I, Mok V, Oostenbrugge Rv, Pantoni L, Speck O, Stephan BC, Teipel S, Viswanathan A, Werring D, Chen C, Smith C, van Buchem M, Norrving B, Gorelick PB, Dichgans M; STandards for ReportIng Vascular changes on nEuroimaging (STRIVE v1). Lancet Neurol. 2013 Aug;12(8):822-38.

References

Public health researchers
Living people
Commanders of the Order of the British Empire
Alumni of the University of London
Fellows of Darwin College, Cambridge
NIHR Senior Investigators
Year of birth missing (living people)